The then Beijing Olympic Games Bidding Committee unveiled the venue layout plan for the 2022 Winter Olympics on 20 February 2014:the plan was include the five ice events at the Olympic Green, the Capital Indoor Stadium and the Wukesong Sports Center, which were some of the main venues of the 2008 Summer Olympics.

Beijing Cluster

Olympic Green Venues

 Beijing National Indoor Stadium: Ice hockey
 Beijing National Stadium: Opening, awarding and closing ceremonies
 Beijing National Speed Skating Oval: Speed skating
 Beijing National Aquatics Centre: Curling

Non-competition venues

 Beijing 2022 Olympic Village
 China National Convention Center: MPC/IBC

Other Venues

 Capital Indoor Stadium: Figure skating, Short track speed skating
 Wukesong Sports Centre: Ice hockey
 Big Air Shougang: Big air

Yanqing Cluster
 Yanqing National Alpine Skiing Centre: Alpine skiing
 Yanqing National Sliding Centre: Bobsleigh, Luge, Skeleton
 Yanqing MMC: Media Center
 Yanqing Olympic Village
 Yanqing Medals Plaza

Zhangjiakou Cluster
 Zhangjiakou National Cross-Country Centre: Cross-country skiing, Nordic combined (Cross country)
 Zhangjiakou National Ski Jumping Centre: Ski jumping, Nordic combined (Ski jumping)
 Zhangjiakou National Biathlon Centre: Biathlon
 Genting Snow Park: Snowboarding, Freestyle skiing
 Genting Hotel: Media Center
 Zhangjiakou Olympic Village
 Zhangjiakou Medals Plaza

Notes

References 

 
2022
Buildings and structures in Beijing
Buildings and structures in Hebei
Beijing-related lists
Sport in Beijing
Olympics